Cotard's syndrome, also known as Cotard's delusion or walking corpse syndrome, is a rare mental disorder in which the affected person holds the delusional belief that they are dead, do not exist, are putrefying, or have lost their blood or internal organs. Statistical analysis of a hundred-patient cohort indicated that denial of self-existence is present in 45% of the cases of Cotard's syndrome; the other 55% of the patients presented with delusions of immortality.

A mild case is characterized by despair and self-loathing, while a severe case is characterized by intense delusions of negation, and chronic psychiatric depression.

The case of "Mademoiselle X" describes a woman who denied the existence of parts of her body (somatoparaphrenia) and of her need to eat. She claimed that she was condemned to eternal damnation, and therefore could not die a natural death. In the course of experiencing "the delirium of negation", Mademoiselle X died of starvation.

Cotard's syndrome is not mentioned in either the Diagnostic and Statistical Manual of Mental Disorders (DSM) or the 10th edition of the International Statistical Classification of Diseases and Related Health Problems (ICD-10) of the World Health Organization.

Signs and symptoms
Delusions of negation are the central symptom in Cotard's syndrome. The patient usually denies their own existence, the existence of a certain body part, or the existence of a portion of their body. Cotard's syndrome exists in three stages:

 Germination stage: symptoms of psychotic depression and of hypochondria appear;
 Blooming stage: full development of the syndrome and delusions of negation; and;
 Chronic stage: continued severe delusions along with chronic psychiatric depression.

Cotard's syndrome withdraws the person with the condition from other people due to neglect of their personal hygiene and physical health. Delusions of negation of self prevent the patient from making sense of external reality, which then produces a distorted view of the external world. Such delusions of negation are usually found in schizophrenia. Although a diagnosis of Cotard's syndrome does not require the patient to have had hallucinations, the strong delusions of negation are comparable to those found in schizophrenic patients.

Distorted reality
The article Betwixt Life and Death: Case Studies of the Cotard Delusion (1996) describes a contemporary case of Cotard's syndrome which occurred in a Scotsman whose brain was damaged in a motorcycle accident:

The article Recurrent Postictal Depression with Cotard Delusion (2005) describes the case of a 14-year-old epileptic boy who experienced Cotard's syndrome after seizures. His mental health history showed themes of death, chronic sadness, decreased physical activity in leisure time, social withdrawal, and disturbed biological functions.

About twice a year, the boy had episodes that lasted between three weeks and three months. In the course of each episode, he said that everyone and everything was dead (including trees), described himself as a dead body, and warned that the world would be destroyed within hours. Throughout the episode, the boy showed no response to pleasurable stimuli, and had no interest in social activities.

Pathophysiology

The underlying neurophysiology and psychopathology of Cotard's syndrome might be related to problems of delusional misidentification. Neurologically, Cotard's syndrome (negation of the self) is thought to be related to Capgras delusion (people replaced by impostors); each type of delusion is thought to result from neural misfiring in the fusiform face area of the brain, which recognizes faces, and in the amygdalae, which associate emotions to a recognized face.

The neural disconnection creates in the patient a sense that the face they are observing is not the face of the person to whom it belongs; therefore, that face lacks the familiarity (recognition) normally associated with it. This results in derealization or a disconnection from the environment. If the observed face is that of a person known to the patient, they experience that face as the face of an impostor (Capgras delusion). If the patient sees their own face, they might perceive no association between the face and their own sense of self—which results in the patient believing that they do not exist (Cotard's syndrome).

Cotard's syndrome is usually encountered in people with psychosis, as in schizophrenia. It is also found in clinical depression, derealization, brain tumor, and migraine headaches. The medical literature indicate that the occurrence of Cotard's syndrome is associated with lesions in the parietal lobe. As such, the Cotard's syndrome patient presents a greater incidence of brain atrophy—especially of the median frontal lobe—than do people in control groups.

Cotard's syndrome also has resulted from a patient's adverse physiological response to a drug (e.g., acyclovir) and to its prodrug precursor (e.g., valaciclovir). The occurrence of Cotard's syndrome symptoms was associated with a high serum-concentration of 9-carboxymethoxymethylguanine (CMMG), the principal metabolite of acyclovir.

As such, the patient with weak kidneys (impaired renal function) continued risking the occurrence of delusional symptoms despite the reduction of the dose of acyclovir. Hemodialysis resolved the patient's delusions (of negating the self) within hours of treatment, which suggests that the occurrence of Cotard's syndrome symptoms might not always be cause for psychiatric hospitalization of the patient.

Treatment
Pharmacological treatments, both mono-therapeutic and multi-therapeutic, using antidepressants, antipsychotics, and mood stabilizers have been successful. Likewise, with the depressed patient, electroconvulsive therapy (ECT) is more effective than pharmacotherapy.

Cotard's syndrome resulting from an adverse drug reaction to valacyclovir is attributed to elevated serum concentration of one of valacyclovir's metabolites, 9-carboxymethoxymethylguanine (CMMG). Successful treatment warrants cessation of valacyclovir. Hemodialysis was associated with timely clearance of CMMG and resolution of symptoms.

Case studies

Society and culture
The protagonist of Charlie Kaufman's 2008 movie Synecdoche, New York is named Caden Cotard. Throughout the film Cotard thinks he is dying, and we see other examples of Cotard's syndrome with scenes such as when his daughter, Olive, begins to scream about having blood in her body and, as the film goes on, Cotard disappears from the play he is writing about his own life and is portrayed by other actors as he takes the role of a cleaning lady.

It is speculated that Per "Dead" Ohlin, lead vocalist for the black metal bands Mayhem and Morbid, had Cotard's syndrome as a result of a violent assault by bullies in his youth that left him clinically dead for a short time. He developed an obsession with death shortly after (hence his stage name and use of corpse paint), often self-harmed onstage and among friends, and became increasingly depressed and introverted eventually resulting in his suicide in 1991.

The song "Cotard's Solution" by Will Wood and the Tapeworms mentions Cotard's Syndrome in the title (in a play on Cotard's Delusion), and the song has themes of wanting to die, and death in general.

See also
 Depersonalization disorder
 Mortality salience
 Prosopagnosia
 Solipsism
 Mirrored-self misidentification
 Capgras delusion
 Fregoli delusion
 Dead (musician)

References

Young, A., Robertson, I., Hellawell, D., De Pauw, K., & Pentland, B. (1992). Cotard delusion after brain injury. Psychological Medicine, 22(3), 799–804.

External links 

Psychosis
Delusional disorders
Psychopathological syndromes
Delusions